The 2015 Second Division Football Tournament was the first season under its current league division format. The season began on 24 July and ended on 14 September.

Structure and rule changes
Second division will be played for two rounds according to the changes brought to the 2015 season.

Round 1
 Teams play against each other once.
 Top 5 teams qualified for Round 2.
 Bottom 2 teams gets relegated to next season's Third Division.

Round 2
 Teams play against each other once.
 Team to top the league table at the end will be the champions and gets promoted to next season's Dhivehi Premier League.
 Second team will get qualified for the Dhivehi Premier League play-off.

Including Maldives U19 team
 As the Maldives under-19 team will be included in the Second Division Football Tournament from this year onwards, this team will neither be promoted to Dhivehi Premier League even if they finish it first, nor relegated to Third Division Football Tournament if they finished at the bottom two. Thus, they will not be either qualified to play in the Dhivehi Premier League play-off.

Teams
A total of 10 teams will be contesting in the league, including 6 sides from the 2014 Second Division, 2 sides promoted from 2014 Third Division, 1 side relegated from 2014 Dhivehi League and Maldives national under-19 football team.

Teams and their divisions
Note: Table lists clubs in alphabetical order.

Personnel
Note: Flags indicate national team as has been defined under FIFA eligibility rules. Players may hold more than one non-FIFA nationality.

League table

Matches

Round 1 matches

Round 2 matches

External links
 Vyansa did not attend

References

Maldivian Second Division Football Tournament seasons
Maldives
Maldives
2